Mount Druitt, an electoral district of the Legislative Assembly in the Australian state of New South Wales, has had two incarnations, the first from 1971 to 1981, the second from 1999 to the present.


Members

Election results

Elections in the 2010s

2019

2015

2011

Elections in the 2000s

2007

2003

Elections in the 1990s

1999

1995

1991

1981 - 1988

Elections in the 1970s

1978

1976

1973

1971

References

New South Wales state electoral results by district